Maruja Troncoso Ortega (born 18 January 1937) is a Spanish lyric soprano and professor of singing.

Biography
Maruja Troncoso Ortega was born into a family with a close relationship to music. Her father, Claudio Troncoso, was a violinist and director of the Municipal Band of Arcos de la Frontera.

Her debut as a singer was at the Jerez Orfeón, with whom she participated in numerous concerts: zarzuelas, sacred music, and some novelties such as Las tres Cantigas de Alfonso X el Sabio. She also appeared with the group Aficionados Líricos Reunidos, who performed every Sunday at the Teatro Villamarta, promoted by Agustín Brotón.

At 28, Troncoso moved to Madrid, looking for new horizons to develop her career, and continued studying with Miguel García Barroso. She responded to the public call for admission to the RTVE Choir, obtaining a place. There she had the opportunity to sing under the baton of Igor Markevitch, Nadia Boulanger, Odón Alonso, Ros Marbá, Rafael Frühbeck de Burgos, and García Asensi, among others. In 1967 she joined the Compañía Lírica Amadeo Vives, directed by José Tamayo, performing at Summer Festivals in Madrid, Barcelona, and Seville, with the Antología de la Zarzuela for several years. She was later part of the Compañía del Teatro de la Zarzuela de Madrid.

She obtained the position of professor of singing at the Conservatory of Seville in 1982, and was subsequently promoted to the chair. She has collaborated on the selection of the members of the Teatro Villamarta Choir in Jerez, where she taught a singing course.

She published a master lesson, La voz humana y el canto lírico, in 2000.

She has been a member of the  since 2001.

Repertoire

Zarzuelas
 "La verbena de la Paloma"
 "La revoltosa"
 "La del manojo de Rosas"
 "La reina Mora"
 "Agua, azucarrillos y aguardiente"
 "Los gavilanes"
 "La viejecita"
 ""
 ""
 "La Tabernera del Puerto"
 "Bohemios"
 "La Parranda"
 "Pan y Toros"
 "Luisa Fernanda"
 "El Caserío"

Operettas
 Die Fledermaus by Johann Strauss

Notable students
 Rosa María de Alba, soprano
 Elisa Beltrán, soprano
 Rosario Hidalgo López, director of the Triarte Center for Artistic Studies
 Angel Hortas, musical director of the Cathedral of Jerez and organist
 Pilar Marchena, flamenco singer-songwriter
 Alicia Molina García, soprano
 Amanda Serna, soprano
 María del Valle Duque Vassal'lo

References

1937 births
20th-century Spanish educators
20th-century Spanish singers
Spanish women educators
Living people
People from Jerez de la Frontera
Spanish music educators
Spanish operatic sopranos
Spanish women academics
Voice teachers
20th-century Spanish women singers
20th-century women educators